Trachylepis buettneri is a species of skink, a lizard in the family Scincidae. The species is native to Central Africa and West Africa.

Etymology
The specific name, buettneri, is in honor of German botanist Oskar Alexander Richard Büttner.

Geographic range
T. buettneri is found in Cameroon, Central African Republic, Democratic Republic of the Congo, Ghana, Ivory Coast, and Togo.

Habitat
The preferred natural habitat of T. buettneri is savanna.

Description
T. buettneri has a very long tail. The tail length may be four times the snout-to-vent length (SVL).

Reproduction
T. buettneri is oviparous.

References

Further reading
Matschie P (1893). "Einige anscheinend neue Reptilien und Amphibien aus West-Afrika". Sitzungs-berichte der Gesellschaft Naturforschender Freunde zu Berlin 1893: 170–175. (Mabuya büttneri, new species, pp. 170–171). (in German).
Segniagbeto, Gabriel Hoinsoude; Trape, Jean-François; Afiademanyo, Komlan M.; Rödel, Mark-Oliver; Ohler, Annemarie; Dubois, Alain; David, Patrick; Meirte, Danny; Glitho, Isabelle Adolé; Petrozzi, Fabio; Luiselli, Luca (2015). "Checklist of the lizards of Togo (West Africa), with comments on systematics, distribution, ecology, and conservation". Zoosystema 37 (2): 381–402.
Trape J-F, Trape S, Chirio L (2012). Lézards, crocodiles et tortues d'Afrique occidentale et du Sahara. Paris: IRD Orstom. 503 pp. . (in French).

Trachylepis
Reptiles described in 1893
Taxa named by Paul Matschie